Thomas N'Ma (born 25 May 1944) is a Liberian sprinter. He competed in the men's 400 metres at the 1972 Summer Olympics.

References

1944 births
Living people
Athletes (track and field) at the 1972 Summer Olympics
Liberian male sprinters
Olympic athletes of Liberia
Place of birth missing (living people)